Lee Collins is a software engineer and co-founder of the Unicode Consortium. In 1987, along with Joe Becker and Mark Davis they began to develop what is today known as Unicode. Collins has a Master of Arts in East Asian Languages and Cultures from Columbia University and was the Technical Vice President of Unicode Consortium from 1991 to 1993.

References

Further reading

Living people
Year of birth missing (living people)
Columbia Graduate School of Arts and Sciences alumni
American computer programmers
People involved with Unicode
Apple Inc. employees